Nelson Wilfredo Bonilla Sánchez (born 11 September 1990) is a Salvadoran professional footballer who plays as a striker for Thai League 1 club Chiangrai United and the El Salvador national team.

Career

Club

Alianza
Bonilla scored his first goal for Alianza against Atlético Marte on 13 August 2011. He scored both goals against Águila on 11 September 2011, the match ended 2–1 to Alianza. He scored the only goal against Juventud Independiente on 2 November 2011. On 27 November 2011 he scored a 54th-minute equaliser against Firpo the match ended 1–1. On 22 January he scored the winning goal against Juventud Independiente in the 60th minute, the match ended 2–1. On 5 February 2012 he scored the first goal in a 3–1 defeat against Águila.

Viitorul
In July 2014, Bonilla signed with Romanian club Viitorul Constanța.

Zira
On 31 August 2015, Bonilla signed a two-year contract with Zira FK of the Azerbaijan Premier League. On 23 May 2016, Zira announced that Bonilla had extended his contract with the club for an additional season.

Nacional
On 16 June 2016, it was announced that Bonilla would leave Zira to join Portuguese club Nacional.

International
Bonilla made his debut for El Salvador on 23 May 2012 away to New Zealand in a 2–2 draw. Bonilla's scored his first goal for El Salvador on 27 May 2012 against Moldova, with his team going on to win 2–0.

Career statistics

Club

International

International goals
Scores and results list El Salvador's goal tally first.

References

External links
 
 
 
 

1990 births
Living people
Sportspeople from San Salvador
Association football forwards
Salvadoran footballers
Salvadoran expatriate footballers
Alianza F.C. footballers
FC Viitorul Constanța players
Zira FK players
C.D. Nacional players
Gaziantep F.K. footballers
U.D. Oliveirense players
Nelson Bonilla
Nelson Bonilla
Nelson Bonilla
Nelson Bonilla
Liga I players
Expatriate footballers in Romania
Expatriate footballers in Thailand
Azerbaijan Premier League players
El Salvador international footballers
2013 Copa Centroamericana players
2015 CONCACAF Gold Cup players
2017 Copa Centroamericana players
2017 CONCACAF Gold Cup players
2019 CONCACAF Gold Cup players
Primeira Liga players